Vincent Thompson (born February 21, 1957) is an American former professional football running back who played in the National Football League for the Detroit Lions.

References

1957 births
Living people
American football running backs
Detroit Lions players
Players of American football from Trenton, New Jersey
Villanova Wildcats football players